The Dīgha Nikāya ("Collection of Long Discourses") is a Buddhist scriptures collection, the first of the five Nikāyas, or collections, in the Sutta Pitaka, which is one of the "three baskets" that compose the Pali Tipitaka of Theravada Buddhism.  Some of the most commonly referenced suttas from the Digha Nikaya include the Mahāparinibbāṇa Sutta (DN 16), which described the final days and passing of the Lord Buddha, the Sigālovāda Sutta (DN 31) in which the Buddha discusses ethics and practices for lay followers, and the Samaññaphala Sutta (DN 2), Brahmajāla Sutta (DN 1) which describes and compares the point of view of Lord Buddha and other ascetics in India about the universe and time (past, present, and future); and the Poṭṭhapāda (DN 9) Suttas, which describe the benefits and practice of Samatha meditation.

Structure and contents
The Digha Nikaya consists of 34 discourses, broken into three groups:
Silakkhandha-vagga—The Division Concerning Morality (suttas 1-13); named after a tract on monks' morality that occurs in each of its suttas (in theory; in practice it is not written out in full in all of them); in most of them it leads on to the jhānas (the main attainments of samatha meditation), the cultivation of psychic powers and attaining the fruit of an Arahant.
Maha-vagga—The Great Division (suttas 14-23)
Patika-vagga—The Patika Division (suttas 24-34)

Suttas of the Digha Nikaya

Correspondence with the Dīrgha Āgama
The Digha Nikaya corresponds to the Dīrgha Āgama found in the Sutta Pitikas of various Sanskritic early Buddhists schools, fragments of which survive in Sanskrit. A complete version of the Dīrgha Āgama of the Dharmagupta school survives in Chinese translation by the name Cháng Ahánjīng (:ch:長阿含經). It contains 30 sūtras in contrast to the 34 suttas of the Theravadin Dīgha Nikāya. In addition, portions of the Sarvāstivādin school's Dīrgha Āgama survive in Sanskrit and in Tibetan translation.

Translations
Complete Translations:
 Dīgha Nikāya | The Long Collection by Ṭhānissaro Bhikkhu
 Dialogues of the Buddha, tr T. W. and C. A. F. Rhys Davids, 1899–1921, 3 volumes, Pali Text Society, Vol. 1, Vol. 2, Vol. 3.
 Thus Have I Heard: the Long Discourses of the Buddha, tr Maurice Walshe, Wisdom Pubs, 1987; later reissued under the original subtitle; 
The Long Discourses, tr Bhikkhu Sujato, 2018, published online at SuttaCentral and released into the public domain.

Selections:

 The Buddha's Philosophy of Man, Rhys Davids tr, rev Trevor Ling, Everyman, out of print; 10 suttas including 2, 16, 22, 31
 Long Discourses of the Buddha, tr Mrs A. A. G. Bennett, Bombay, 1964; 1-16
 Ten Suttas from Digha Nikaya, Burma Pitaka Association, Rangoon, 1984; 1, 2, 9, 15, 16, 22, 26, 28-9, 31

See also

 Anguttara Nikaya
 Early Buddhist texts
 Khuddaka Nikaya
 List of suttas
 Majjhima Nikaya
 Pāli Canon
 Samyutta Nikaya
 Sutta Piṭaka
 Samaññaphala Sutta
 Mahāparinibbāṇa Sutta

Notes

External links

Digha Nikaya in Pali and English at metta.lk
A Study of the Digha Nikaya of the Suttapitaka
Digha Nikaya in English at accesstoinsight.org
Free listing of all the Suttas (Alpha by sutta title)
Digha Nikaya in English, Nepali and Nepalbhasha

Theravada Buddhist texts
 
Pali Buddhist texts